Rekawa Lagoon is a coastal waterbody located in Hambantota Districtt in the Southern Province, Sri Lanka and it is located  south of Colombo. The lagoon possesses a rich biodiversity with a variety of flora (ex; mangroves) and fauna (ex; fish, crustaceans, birds).

Features 
The lagoon is connected to the Indian Ocean with a  narrow inland waterway. Most parts of the lagoon are encircled with a mangrove belt. Kirama-oya river (Tangalu-oya river) that enters the lagoon at the sea ward end of the inlet canal is the main freshwater supply. Apart from the main freshwater inflow, there are two small freshwater streams function only in rainy season and provide surface runoff from the catchment.

Shrimp fishery 
Shrimp fishery is one of the main livelihoods among the lagoonal community.  However this supports the people only during the shrimp fishery season which extends from October to April. The most abundant shrimp species in Rekawa lagoon and commercially most important shrimp species is Penaeus indicus (White shrimp).

Environmental problems

Ecohydrological impact of the Kapuhenwela causeway 
Water passes under the causeway through twenty three, 23 cm diameter pipes which greatly reduce the volume and speed of water entering and leaving the lagoon system. This causeway has prevented flushing of the lagoon by natural water flow, causing continues sedimentation in the lagoon.

Mangroves exploitation 
Around the lagoon, many mangrove species including Lumnitzera racemosa, Aegiceras corniculatum, Bruguiera gymnorhiza, Excoecaria agallocha, Rhizophora mcronata, Avicennia marina, and Avicennia officinalis are found. In addition to its ecological benefits (ex; shrimp and fish habitats), traditionally, Rekawa people have used mangroves for the benefit of the local community, but the increasing population has led to an increasing non-sustainable abuse of the resources. Mangroves have been exploited for timber for building dwellings and boats and fuel-wood for cooking in the area. Recent Researches discovered, even small scale cutting could affect the age composition and reproductive capacity of the mangrove forests in Rekawa lagoon.

Research work 
A number of studies have been carried out recently on ecohydrology and mangroves of the Rekawa Lagoon.
Ex;
 Water balance and renewal time of Rekawa lagoon, Sri Lanka; a restorative approach.
 Present status of small-scale exploitation of mangroves in Rekawa Lagoon, Sri Lanka.
 Effects of industrialisation and urbanisation on the biology and water quality of three lagoons in southern Sri Lanka viz. Rekawa, Dondra and Galle with reference to water pollution and upstream land uses.
 Applicability of Salinity Stratification Estimation by New Bulk Model for Two Choked Coastal Lagoons in Sri Lanka.
 Variation of Natural Recruitments, Root Yield and Belowground Carbon Stocks between a Forest Gap and Uncut Forest in Rekawa Mangroves, Sri Lanka.

References

Bodies of water of Hambantota District
Lagoons of Sri Lanka